Torfason is an Icelandic patronymic surname, literally meaning "son of Torfi". It may refer to:

Guðmundur Torfason (born 1961), Icelandic footballer
Hörður Torfason (born 1945), Icelandic songwriter and activist
Mikael Torfason (born 1974), Icelandic writer
Ómar Torfason (born 1959), Icelandic footballer

Icelandic-language surnames